Soraya Aghaei Hajiagha (born 28 January 1996) is an Iranian badminton player. She competed at the 2020 Tokyo Olympics, being the first ever women's badminton player to represent Iran at the Olympic Games.

Achievements

BWF International Challenge/Series (4 titles, 7 runners-up)
Women's singles

Women's doubles

  BWF International Challenge tournament
  BWF International Series tournament
  BWF Future Series tournament

References

External links 

 

Living people
1996 births
Sportspeople from Tehran
Iranian female badminton players
Badminton players at the 2020 Summer Olympics
Olympic badminton players of Iran
Badminton players at the 2014 Asian Games
Badminton players at the 2018 Asian Games
Asian Games competitors for Iran
20th-century Iranian women
21st-century Iranian women